Grace Mary Colman (30 April 1892 – 7 July 1971) was a British politician. She was Labour Member of Parliament (MP) for Tynemouth from 1945 to 1950.

References

External links 
 
 

1892 births
1971 deaths
UK MPs 1945–1950
Labour Party (UK) MPs for English constituencies
Female members of the Parliament of the United Kingdom for English constituencies
20th-century British women politicians
20th-century English women
20th-century English people